Raza Ali Dar (born 11 December 1987) is a Pakistani cricketer who plays for Lahore cricket team. In April 2018, he was named in Federal Areas' squad for the 2018 Pakistan Cup.

References

External links
 

1987 births
Living people
Pakistani cricketers
Lahore cricketers
Karachi Port Trust cricketers
Punjab (Pakistan) cricketers
Cricketers from Lahore
Sylhet Strikers cricketers
Legends of Rupganj cricketers
Agrani Bank Cricket Club cricketers
Uttara Sporting Club cricketers
Central Punjab cricketers